Alix Spiegel is an American public radio producer and science journalist. She is currently a senior audio editor for The New York Times. Spiegel previously hosted and produced the NPR program Invisibilia with Hanna Rosin and worked on This American Life and for National Public Radio.

Biography

Spiegel grew up in Baltimore, Maryland in a secular Jewish household. Her father was the great-grandson of Joseph Spiegel, the founder of the Spiegel Catalog. Her great-aunt was civil rights activist Polly Spiegel Cowan. She played the violin from a very young age and initially considered a career as a musician. After graduating from Oberlin College, Spiegel moved to Chicago, where she saw an announcement in a newspaper about a fledgling local show for WBEZ called Your American Playhouse: Documentaries About American Life. In 1995 Spiegel began correspondence with the show's producer, Ira Glass, who took her on as an intern. In 1996 the show changed its name to This American Life and was picked up nationally by Public Radio International, by which time Spiegel was producing pieces for the show. That year Spiegel and the show's other producers won the George Foster Peabody Award

In 2002, Spiegel won the Livingston Award for episode #204 "81 Words" about Spiegel's own grandfather, Dr. John Patrick Spiegel, who had a hand in removing homosexuality from the Diagnostic and Statistical Manual of Mental Disorders. In 2007, she won the Alfred I. duPont–Columbia University Award for the segment, "Which One of These is Not Like the Others?" for episode #322, "Shouting Across the Divide".

Having taken up an interest in the human mind, Spiegel eventually moved on to freelance work for NPR's Science Desk where she spent ten years covering psychology and human behavior. In 2008 she won the Robert F. Kennedy Journalism Award for her piece "Stuck and Suicidal in a Post-Katrina Trailer Park". In 2010 she won the Erikson Institute Prize for Excellence in Mental Health Media. She continued to appear as an occasional contributor to This American Life until the launch of her show Invisibilia. Spiegel's science reporting has also been featured in The New York Times and The New Yorker.

References

Living people
People from Baltimore
American Jews
American radio producers
Oberlin College alumni
NPR personalities
This American Life people
Year of birth missing (living people)
Livingston Award winners for National Reporting
Spiegel family
Journalists from Maryland
20th-century American journalists
21st-century American journalists
Women radio producers